Mark Portmann is a musician, songwriter, and record producer who has worked with Celine Dion and Josh Groban.

Portman began to learn classical piano as a child, but beginning at Coconut Creek High School he turned to pop music and jazz. He went to the Eastman School of Music on a scholarship, studying composition, and attended the University of Miami. In 1988, he became a keyboardist in the jazz group The Rippingtons and left the group four years later. In 1997, he released a solo album on Zebra Records titled No Truer Words.

Songs co-produced by Portmann were nominated for ASCAP Latin Music Awards in 2003 and 2010.

References

External links
Official website

Living people
University of Miami alumni
American jazz keyboardists
The Rippingtons members
Year of birth missing (living people)